The Best FIFA Player may refer to:

 The Best FIFA Men's Player
 The Best FIFA Women's Player